Gholamreza Rezaei (born 6 August 1984 in Shiraz, Iran) is an Iranian Football player who played for Sepidrood as a forward in the Iran Pro League.

Club career

Early years
He started his career in Fajr Sepasi in his hometown, Shiraz, where he was introduced to Iranian Football, after showing his talent in Fajr, he was bought Saba Battery. At the end of 2007–2008 season, Persepolis showed interest in him, Rezaei himself stated that he would like to join Persepolis despite being contracted for another year. But, he remained in Saba because the club's officials rejected the move. He had an average season as he was benched at sometimes and was busy with a number of matches for Team Melli. He moved to Emirates in summer 2009. After an unsuccessful half-season at the UAE he moved back to the IPL joining Foolad.

Persepolis
For the 2010–11 season, he joined Persepolis re-uniting with his former manager at the Team Melli, Ali Daei. He made an immediate impact and scored in three of his first four games, all of them being goals which would be the game deciders. He extended his contract with Persepolis for two years, keeping him in the team till 2014.

On 30 December 2012, he scored the fastest goal in the history of Iran Pro League (the record was broken by Mohammad Reza Khalatbari on 10 December 2014) and also the fastest in 2012 in a 2–0 win against his former team, Fajr Sepasi at Hafezieh Stadium. He was mostly used as the substitute in 2012–13 season. On 4 November 2013, Rezaei announced that will be left Persepolis in January 2014. He signed a contract with Foolad on 17 November 2013.

Foolad
In his first year with Foolad he made 14 league appearances, failing to score. His first goal with the club came on 16 April 2014 in an AFC Champions League match against El Jaish of Qatar. Foolad won that match and advanced to the knockout stages of the Champions League.

Naft Tehran

Rezaei joined Naft Tehran on 1 July 2014, after he signed a two-year contract with the club on 23 June 2014.

Club career statistics

 Assist Goals

International career
Rezaei made his debut for the Iran national football team on May 25, 2008 in a friendly match with Zambia that ended 3-2.

In this match, Rezaei scored the second goal for Iran. A cross by Hajsafi found Rezaei on the far post, and Rezaei's slightly deflected shot found its way into the net. In World Cup 2010 Qualifying Rezaei scored twice for his country against Syria and Kuwait. He was called and played for Team Melli in 2010 FIFA World Cup qualification and 2014 FIFA World Cup qualification and 2011 AFC Asian Cup qualification and also 2015 AFC Asian Cup qualification.
He won the 2008 WAFF and ended the campaign in quarterfinal at 2011 Asian Cup.

International goals
Scores and results list Iran's goal tally first.

Honours
Persepolis
Hazfi Cup (1): 2010–11
Runner-up (1): 2012–13

Foolad
Iran Pro League (1): 2013–14

References

External links

 Gholamreza Rezaei at PersianLeague.com
 Gholamreza Rezaei at TeamMelli.com
 Gholamreza Rezaei's Profile in 18ghadam.ir
 

1984 births
Living people
Iranian footballers
Iran international footballers
Persian Gulf Pro League players
Foolad FC players
Fajr Sepasi players
Saba players
Persepolis F.C. players
Naft Tehran F.C. players
2011 AFC Asian Cup players
People from Shiraz
Association football forwards
Association football wingers
Footballers at the 2010 Asian Games
Asian Games competitors for Iran
Sportspeople from Fars province